Djibril Diawara (born 3 January 1975 ) is a retired French-Senegalese footballer.

Career
He played for Le Havre, Monaco, Torino and Bolton Wanderers during his professional career.

Diawara played in Jean Tigana's talented Monaco side which famously put Manchester United out of the Champions League in 1998 on away goals after a 1–1 draw at Old Trafford.

He went on loan to Bolton in the Premier League in 2001 and made 9 league appearances, getting sent off once against Everton.

Honours 
Monaco
 Trophée des Champions: 1997

References

External links
 
 Player profile - lfp.fr 

1975 births
Living people
Senegalese footballers
French footballers
Senegalese expatriate footballers
Premier League players
Serie A players
Serie B players
Ligue 1 players
Association football defenders
Bolton Wanderers F.C. players
Torino F.C. players
AS Monaco FC players
Le Havre AC players
Expatriate footballers in France
Expatriate footballers in Italy
Senegalese expatriate sportspeople in England
Expatriate footballers in England
Footballers from Dakar
Senegalese expatriate sportspeople in Italy